Jaama may refer to several places in Estonia:

Jaama, Ida-Viru County, village in Illuka Parish, Ida-Viru County
Jaama, Jõgeva County, village in Saare Parish, Jõgeva County

See also
Kingisepp (former Finnish name was Jaama)